Egypt has competed at every edition of the African Games. Its athletes have won a total of 1635 medals.

Medals by Games

Below is a table representing all medals across the Games in which it has competed. 

https://bestsports.com.br/db/cmppag.php?cmp=79&lang=2

https://bestsports.com.br/db/cmppaipag.php?cmp=79&pai=60&lang=2

See also 
 Egypt at the Olympics
 Egypt at the Paralympics
 Sports in Egypt

References

External links 
 All-Africa Games index - todor66.com